Haplochromis macrocephalus is a species of cichlid endemic to the Tanzanian portion of Lake Victoria where it is found in Mwanza Gulf and Speke Gulf.  This species can reach a length of  SL.

References

macrocephalus
macrocephala
Endemic freshwater fish of Tanzania
Fish of Lake Victoria
Fish described in 1998
Taxonomy articles created by Polbot